The 1973 Utah Utes football team was an American football team that represented the University of Utah as a member of the Western Athletic Conference (WAC) during the 1973 NCAA Division I football season. In their sixth and final season under head coach Bill Meek, the Utes compiled an overall record of 7–5 with a mark of 4–2 against conference opponents, placing third in the WAC. Home games were played on campus at Robert Rice Stadium in Salt Lake City.

Five weeks after the season ended, in early 1974, Meek resigned. Defensive line coach Tom Lovat, a 35-year-old alumnus from Bingham, was retained for the interim for recruiting continuation and was promoted later that month.

Schedule

Roster

NFL Draft
Four Utes were selected in the 1974 NFL Draft, which lasted 17 rounds (442 selections).

References

Utah
Utah Utes football seasons
Utah Utes football